Natalya Yevdokimova may refer to:

Natalya Yevdokimova (runner) (born 1978), Ukrainian-Russian middle-distance runner
Natalya Yevdokimova (triple jumper) (born 1993), Russian triple jumper